Indian presidential election, 2002 was held on 15 July 2002 to elect President of India. On 18 July 2002, the results were declared. A. P. J. Abdul Kalam became the 11th President by beating his nearest rival Lakshmi Sahgal.

Candidates

Official candidates

The election was fought between two major candidates, A. P. J. Abdul Kalam and Lakshmi Sahgal. Kalam was backed by the ruling Bharatiya Janata Party and its National Democratic Alliance. All India Anna Dravida Munnetra Kazhagam, Telugu Desam Party and Bahujan Samaj Party also supported his candidature. The major opposition party Indian National Congress, two days after the nomination, declared its support to Kalam's candidature.

Left Front were opposed to Kalam's candidature, and eventually nominated freedom fighter and Indian National Army's Rani of Jhansi Regiment commander Lakshmi Sahgal as their candidate.

Potential candidates

Potential candidates included, President K. R. Narayanan, Maharashtra Governor P. C. Alexander, Vice President Krishan Kant and Former Chief Justice of India A. M. Ahmadi.

Results

References

2002 elections in India
2002